Elaeocarpus linsmithii is a species of flowering plant in the family Elaeocarpaceae and is endemic to north-east Queensland. It is a shrub with oblong to elliptic leaves, white or pale green flowers and oval fruit.

Description

Taxonomy
Elaeocarpus linsmithii was first formally described in 1984 by Gordon P. Guymer in the Kew Bulletin. The specific epithet (linsmithii) honours Lindsay Stuart Smith.

Distribution and habitat

Conservation status
Elaeocarpus linsmithii is listed as of "least concern" under the Queensland Government Nature Conservation Act 1992.

References

linsmithii
Oxalidales of Australia
Flora of Queensland
Plants described in 1984
Endemic flora of Australia